Mikhail Semyonovich Shchepkin (the village Krasnoe, Oboyan county, Kursk Province  — ) was the most famous Russian Empire actor of the 19th century. He is considered the "father" of realist acting in Russia and, via the influence of his student, Glikeriya Fedotova, a major influence on the development of the 'system' of Konstantin Stanislavski (who was born in the year in which Shchepkin died). Shchepkin's significance to the Theatre of Russia is comparable to that of David Garrick to the English theatre.

He distinguished between two kinds of actors, both of whom are dedicated to the art of acting: (1) those who have developed the art of pretense on the basis of intelligence and reason; (2) those who express feelings actually experienced by the actor in performance and work on the basis of "a flaming-soul, heavenly spark." Shchepkin considered the effect of the latter approach superior to that of the former. He was opposed to the principles advanced by the French playwright and philosopher Denis Diderot in his Paradox of the Actor (published posthumously in 1830), which inverted Shchepkin's evaluation.

Life
Shchepkin was born in the village of Krasnoe, in the Kursk Province of the Russian Empire, to a serf family owned by Count G. S. Volkenshtein.  Shchepkin's freedom had to be bought by his admirers in 1821. Three years later, he joined the Maly Theatre in Moscow, which he would dominate for the next 40 years—it became known as the 'House of Shchepkin'. Shchepkin was the first to play Famusov in the Woe from Wit (1831) and the Mayor in The Government Inspector (1836). His acting was acclaimed by Alexander Pushkin, Nikolai Gogol, Alexander Herzen, and Ivan Turgenev for its subtlety, with much attention given to realistic detail and understatement.

Acting philosophy
Shchepkin argued that an actor ought to get into the skin of a character, identifying with their thoughts and feelings; observation of life and the actor's knowledge of their own nature provide the source for an actor's work. In 1848 he wrote:

Shchepkin's distinction between the 'actor of reason' and the 'actor of feeling' influenced the formation of the ideas about acting contained in the 'system' devised by Konstantin Stanislavski.

Family
In 1812, Shchepkin married Elena Dmitrievna ("Alyosha") who was a Turkish captive during the Siege of Anapa. They had five children, including the philologist ; the publisher and teacher ; the lawyer Petr Mikhailovich; and the actresses Fyokla (Faina) Mikhailovna and Alexandra Mikhailovna.

See also 
 Tatiana Shchepkina-Kupernik, his granddaughter

References

Bibliography
 Banham, Martin, ed. 1998. The Cambridge Guide to Theatre. Cambridge: Cambridge UP. .
 Benedetti, Jean. 1999. Stanislavski: His Life and Art. Revised edition. Original edition published in 1988. London: Methuen. .
 Benedetti, Jean. 2005. The Art of the Actor: The Essential History of Acting, From Classical Times to the Present Day. London: Methuen. .
 Carlson, Marvin. 1993. Theories of the Theatre: A Historical and Critical Survey from the Greeks to the Present. Expanded ed. Ithaca and London: Cornell University Press. .
 Golub, Spencer. 1998b. "Shchepkin, Mikhail (Semyonovich)". In Banham (1998, 985-986).
 Senelick, Laurence. 1984. Serf Actor: The Life and Art of Mikhail Shchepkin. Westport, Conn.: Greenwood Press. .

External links

1788 births
1863 deaths
Male actors from the Russian Empire
Acting theorists
Russian serfs
19th-century actors from the Russian Empire